David Klemperer (born 22 June 1980) is a beach volleyball player from Germany, who represented his native country in the 2008 Olympics in Beijing, China with Eric Koreng.

References

External links
 
 
 

1980 births
Living people
German men's beach volleyball players
Beach volleyball players at the 2008 Summer Olympics
Olympic beach volleyball players of Germany
Sportspeople from Kiel